is the 2nd indie single by the Japanese female idol group Momoiro Clover, released in Japan on November 11, 2009.

Track listing

Limited Editions A, B 

Limited Edition A

Limited Edition B
 Limited Edition B came with a photobook

Regular Edition

Chart performance

References

External links 
 CD single details on the official site

2009 singles
Momoiro Clover Z songs
Japanese-language songs
2009 songs